Kukar is a small village in Croatia located approximately 3 km from the town of Vrlika under the mountain Dinara. It was part of the Vrlika municipality.

History
The history of the village of Kukar is closely tied with the history of the town and municipality of Vrlika.

Notable people 
Krajina president and prime minister, as well as SDP president Milan Babić, was born in Kukar in 1956, when it was part of the SFR Yugoslavia.

References

Populated places in Split-Dalmatia County